is a prefecture of Japan located in the Kansai region of Honshu. Mie Prefecture is bordered by Gifu Prefecture to the north, Shiga Prefecture and Kyoto Prefecture to the northwest, Nara Prefecture to the west, Wakayama Prefecture to the southwest, and Aichi Prefecture to the east.

Tsu is the capital and Yokkaichi is the largest city of Mie Prefecture, with other major cities including Suzuka, Matsusaka, Ise, and Kuwana. Mie Prefecture is located on the eastern coast of the Kii Peninsula, forming the western side of Ise Bay which features the mouths of the Kiso Three Rivers. Mie Prefecture is a popular tourism destination home to Nagashima Spa Land, Suzuka International Racing Course, and some of the oldest and holiest sites in Shinto, the traditional religion of Japan, including the Ise Grand Shrine and the Tsubaki Grand Shrine.

History 

Until the Meiji Restoration, the area that is now Mie Prefecture was made up of Ise Province, Shima Province, Iga Province, and part of Kii Province.

Evidence of human habitation in Mie dates back more than 10,000 years. During the Jōmon and Yayoi periods, agricultural communities began to form along the river and coastal areas of the region. Ise Shrine is said to have been established during the Yayoi period, and in the 7th century the Saikū Imperial Residence was built in what is now Meiwa Town to serve as both a residence and administrative centre for the Saiō, an Imperial Princess who served as High Priestess of Ise Shrine.

During the Edo period, the area now known as Mie Prefecture consisted of several feudal domains, each ruled by an appointed lord. Transport networks, including the Tokaido and Ise Roads, were built. Port towns such as Ohminato, Kuwana and Anōtsu, posting stations and castle towns flourished. Pilgrimages to Ise Shrine also became very popular.

After the Meiji Restoration, the former provinces of Ise, Shima and Iga as well as a portion of eastern Kii, were organized and reorganized repeatedly. In 1871, the area from the Kiso Three Rivers in the north to present-day Tsu became Anōtsu Prefecture, and the area south of that became Watarai Prefecture. In 1872, the Anōtsu prefectural seat moved from Tsu to Yokkaichi, and the prefecture itself was renamed Mie. For a variety of reasons, including the strong likelihood that Mie would eventually merge with Watarai, the prefectural seat returned to Tsu the following year, and Mie Prefecture took its present-day form in 1876, when it merged with its southern neighbor.

The name Mie supposedly was taken from a comment about the region made by Yamato Takeru on his way back from conquering the eastern regions.

In 1959, many people died as parts of Mie were devastated by the Ise-wan Typhoon, the strongest typhoon to hit Japan in recorded history. Crops were destroyed, sea walls ruined, roads and railways damaged and a substantial number of people were injured or left homeless.

In May 2016, the city of Shima hosted the 42nd G7 summit, the third summit without the presence of Russia.

Geography 

Mie Prefecture forms the eastern part of the Kii Peninsula, and borders on Aichi, Gifu, Shiga, Kyoto, Nara, and Wakayama. It is considered part of the Kansai and Tōkai regions due to its geographical proximity to Aichi Prefecture and its cultural influence from Kansai, such as the fact that Kansai dialect is spoken in Mie. Traditionally, though, the Iga region of Mie is considered to have always been a part of Kansai.

 the north-west of Mie consists of the Suzuka Mountains
 along the coast of Ise Bay from the Aichi border to Ise City lies the Ise Plain, where most of the population of Mie live
 south of the Ise Plain is the Shima Peninsula
 bordering Nara in the central-west is the Iga Basin
 running from central Mie to its southern borders is the Nunobiki Mountainous Region.

Mie has a coastline that stretches  and, as of 2000, Mie's  landmass is 64.8 percent forest, 11.5 percent agriculture, 6 percent residential area, 3.8 percent roads, and 3.6 percent rivers. The remaining 10.3 percent are not classified.

The Ise Plain has a relatively moderate climate, averaging  for the year. The Iga Basin has more daily temperature variance and averages temperatures 1 to 2 degrees cooler than the Ise Plain. Southern Mie, south of the Shima Peninsula, has a warmer Pacific marine climate, with Owase Region having one of the heaviest rainfall figures for all of Japan.

 36% of the total area of the prefecture comprised designated Natural Parks, namely:

 Ise-Shima National Park
 Yoshino-Kumano National Park
 Murō-Akame-Aoyama Quasi-National Park
 Suzuka Quasi-National Park
 Akame Ichishikyō Prefectural Natural Park
 Ise-no-Umi Prefectural Natural Park
 Kahadakyō Prefectural Natural Park
 Okuise Miyagawakyō Prefectural Natural Park
 Suigō Prefectural Natural Park

Municipalities 

Since 2006, Mie consists of 29 municipalities: 14 cities and 15 towns.

Mergers 

When the modern municipalities were introduced in 1889, Mie initially consisted of 336 municipalities: 1 (by definition: district-level) city and 21 districts with 18 towns and 317 villages. With the Great Shōwa mergers of the 1950s, the number of municipalities in Mie had dropped to 88 by 1956. The Great Heisei mergers of the 2000s reduced the total from 69 to 29 between 2000 and 2006.

Economy 
Mie Prefecture has traditionally been a link between east and west Japan, thanks largely to the Tokaido and Ise Pilgrimage Roads. Traditional handicrafts such as Iga Braid, Yokkaichi Banko Pottery, Suzuka Ink, Iga Pottery and Ise Katagami flourished. Mie also produces tea, beef, cultured pearls and fruit, mainly mandarin oranges. Food production companies include Azuma Foods.

Northern Mie is home to a number of manufacturing industries, mainly transport machinery manufacturing (vehicles and ships) and heavy chemical industries such as oil refineries. As well as this, Mie Prefecture is expanding into more advanced industries including the manufacture of semiconductors and liquid crystal displays. In Suzuka, the Honda Motor Company maintains a factory established in 1960 that built the Honda Civic, as well as other vehicles.

Demographics

Culture

Universities 
Yokkaichi
Yokkaichi University
Yokkaichi Nursing and Medical Care University
Suzuka
Suzuka International University
Suzuka University of Medical Science
Suzuka National College of Technology
Tsu
Mie University
Mie Prefectural College of Nursing
Matsusaka
Mie Chukyo University
Ise
Kogakkan University
Toba
Toba National College of Maritime Technology

Transportation

Rail
JR Central
Kansai Line (Nagoya-Kameyama)
Kisei Line
Sangu Line
JR West
Kansai Line (Kameyama-Nara)
Kusatsu Line (Tsuge Station)
Kintetsu
Nagoya Line
Osaka Line
Yamada Line
Toba Line
Shima Line
Yunoyama Line
Uchibe Line
Hachioji Line
Suzuka Line
Yoro Railway
Iga Railway
Ise Railway
Sangi Railway

Road

Expressways and toll roads
East Meihan Expressway
Second Meishin Expressway
Ise Expressway
Ise Bayside Expressway
Kisei Expressway
Meihan National Highway
Ise Shima Skyline
Ise Futami Toba Road
Kumano Owase Road

National highways
Route 1
Route 23 (Ise-Yokkaichi-Nagoya-Gamagori-Toyohashi)
Route 25 (Meihan Highway)
Route 42
Route 163
Route 164 (Yokkaichi)
Route 165
Route 167 (Shima-Toba -Ise)
Route 258
Route 301
Route 311
Route 365
Route 421
Route 422
Route 425 (Owase-Totsukawa-Gobo)
Route 477

Ports
Yokkaichi Port - International and domestic container and goods hub port
Tsu Port - Hydrofoil ferry route to Centrair airport (Chubu International Airport)
Matsuzaka Port - Hydrofoil ferry route to Centrair
Toba Port - Ferry route to Ira Cape

Tourism

Notable places 

 Ise Grand Shrine - Japan's holiest Shinto shrine.
 Tsubaki Grand Shrine - Japan's oldest Shinto shrine. 
 Kumano Kodō - World Heritage Site.  Ancient road in southern Mie once used by pilgrims.
 Iga-Ueno - Birthplace of the ninja and home to the Iga Ninja Museum.
 Ise-Shima National Park
 Yoshino-Kumano National Park
 Tage Kitabatakeshi Yakata - Tage Kitabatake clan fortified residence, one of the Continued Top 100 Japanese Castles in 2017.
 Sakakibara Onsen - Famous onsen near Tsu, considered to be the 3rd best onsen in Japan.
 Yunoyama Onsen - Famous onsen near Yokkaichi that sits atop Mount Gozaisho.
 Nagashima Spa Land - One of the largest amusement parks in Japan, located in Kuwana.
 Mikimoto Pearl Island - Museum in Toba that is dedicated to Kōkichi Mikimoto, inventor of pearl cultivation.
 The Wedded Rocks of Okitama Shrine in Futami (now part of the city of Ise)
 Suzuka Circuit - Japan's most famous motor racetrack.
 Saikū - Site of Heian Imperial residence, with modern museum and reconstructed Heian building.
 A large Sonic the Hedgehog statue in the town of Iga  can be found near Kanonji temple which has been the topic of discussion amongst gaming publications.

Notable citizens 

 Aoi, guitarist of The GazettE
 Daikokuya Kōdayū, a Japanese castaway who spent eleven years in Russia
 Daisuke Kishio, voice actor
 Die (musician), guitarist from Dir en grey
 Hakaru Hashimoto, medical scientist
 Hiroshi Okuda, Chairman of the Toyota Motor Corporation, chairman of the Japan Business Federation
 Hiroyuki Ito, a video game designer working for Square Enix
 Jun Maeda, a Japanese writer and co-founder of the software company Key
 Kana Nishino, singer
 Katsuya Okada, former Foreign Minister, and DPJ Secretary General
 Keiichi Yabu, relief pitcher for the San Francisco Giants
 Ken Hirai, Japanese R&B and pop singer
 Kenta Nishimoto, professional badminton player
 Kota Sasaki, racing driver
 Mashiho Takata, a member of Korean-Pop boy group Treasure
 Matsuo Bashō, the most famous poet of the Edo period, renowned for his haiku
 Mikimoto Kōkichi, founder of the cultured pearl     industry
 Mitski Miyawaki, Japanese-American singer-songwriter
 Mitsui Takatoshi, founder of the Mitsui Group
 Miwa Asao, beach volleyball player
 Mizuki Noguchi, the gold medalist in the women's marathon event in the 2004 Summer Olympics
 Norinaga Motoori, a Japanese scholar of Kokugaku during the Edo period
 Norinaga Motoori, scholar of Kokugaku during the Edo period
 Ranpo Edogawa, famous mystery novelist
 Yasujirō Ozu, famous filmmaker
 Yukio Ozaki, a politician said to be the father of Japan's constitutional government

Famous products 
 Akafuku, a sweet made with mochi and sweet red bean paste
 Spiny lobster, known as Ise ebi (伊勢えび), named after the old province
 Matsusaka beef

Government and politics 

The prefectural government was briefly moved to Yokkaichi Town in Mie District in 1872 (hence the name Mie), but the capital moved back to Anotsu, Anō District (present-day Tsu City) in 1873 and has remained there since. Ignoring small changes through cross-prefectural municipal mergers, neighbourhood transfers and coastline variations, Mie reached its present borders in 1876 when it absorbed Watarai Prefecture. After the modern reactivation of districts in 1878/79, Mie consisted of 21 districts (merged down to 15 in the 1890s). The first prefectural assembly was elected in March 1879 and convened in April. In the introduction of modern cities, towns and villages in 1889, Anotsu became district-independent as Tsu City and the districts were subdivided into 18 towns and 317 villages (see the List of mergers in Mie Prefecture for changes since then).

As in all prefectures except Okinawa, the governor of Mie is directly elected since 1947. The prefectural assembly has 51 members. Both prefectural elections in Mie are currently held as part of unified local elections. In the last round in 2019, governor Eikei Suzuki easily won a third term with broad support from LDP, Shinsei Mie (see below) and Kōmeitō, against only one, JCP-supported challenger; Suzuki was originally elected narrowly in 2011 as centre-right candidate against centre-left supported Naohisa Matsuda, former mayor of Tsu City. In the Mie assembly, the LDP is strongest party; but it is distributed across several parliamentary groups, and the strongest group is Shisei Mie (新政みえ; "Renewal Mie") around members of several local parties of former Democrats.

In the National Diet, Mie is represented by four directly elected members of the House of Representatives and two (one per class) in the House of Councillors. After the national elections of 2016, 2017 and 2019, Mie's directly elected delegation was evenly split between Liberal Democrats (HR district #1: Norihisa Tamura, #4: Noriyo Mitsuya, HC 2019–25 class: Yūmi Yoshikawa) and ex-Democrats (HR #2: Masaharu Nakagawa, #3: Katsuya Okada, HC 2016–22 class: Hirokazu Shiba) in both houses of the Diet.

Sister states 
  São Paulo, Brazil
  Henan, China
  Valencia, Spain

Notes

References
 Nussbaum, Louis-Frédéric and Käthe Roth. (2005).  Japan encyclopedia. Cambridge: Harvard University Press. ;  OCLC 58053128

External links 

 Mie Prefecture official homepage 
 Kanko Mie tourist information
 Outdoor Japan - Section Mie
 Mie International Exchange Foundation

 
Kansai region
Prefectures of Japan